The Frederic Ives Medal is the highest award of the Optical Society, recognizing overall distinction in optics. The prize was established in 1928 by Herbert E. Ives in honor of his father, Frederic Ives. Initially awarded every two years, it has been awarded annually since 1951. The prize is funded by the Jarus W. Quinn Ives Medal Endowment.

Recipients

Source:

See also

 List of physics awards

References

Awards of Optica (society)